Restoration Council may refer to:

 D'ni Restoration Council, a fictional organization in the Myst franchise
 State Law and Order Restoration Council (SLORC), name of State Peace and Development Council (the military regime of Burma) from 1988 to 1997

See also

 Judeo-Christian Council for Constitutional Restoration, an American conservative religious organization formed in early 2005 that ran the defunct website StopActivistJudges.org